The 1806 Great Coastal hurricane was a severe and damaging storm along the East Coast of the United States which produced upwards of  of rainfall in parts of Massachusetts. First observed east of the Lesser Antilles on 17 August, the hurricane arrived at the Bahamas by 19 August. The disturbance continued to drift northward and made landfall at the mouth of the Cape Fear River in North Carolina on 22 August. The storm soon moved out to sea as a Category 2-equivalent hurricane on the Saffir–Simpson hurricane wind scale, persisting off of New England before dissipating south of Nova Scotia on 25 August as a markedly weaker storm. Several French and British warships were damaged out at sea. 

In the Carolinas, salt, sugar, rice, and lumber industries suffered considerably, and several individuals were killed. Wharves and vessels endured moderate damage, with many ships wrecked on North Carolinan barrier islands. A majority of the deaths caused by the hurricane occurred aboard the Rose-in-Bloom offshore of Barnegat Inlet, New Jersey, with 21 of the ship's 48 passengers killed and $171,000 (1806 USD) in damage to its cargo. Upon arriving in New England, reports indicated extreme rainfall, though no deaths were reported; in all, the hurricane killed more than 24 individuals along the entirety of its track.

Meteorological history 
The Great Coastal hurricane of 1806 was first noted far east of the Lesser Antilles on 17 August. Steering currents brought the storm northward, and it approached Charleston, South Carolina on 22 August, where a generally easterly flow preceded the storm indicated its passage far east of the city. The hurricane made landfall at the mouth of the Cape Fear River in North Carolina later that day, though the earliest impacts from the storm started several days earlier, with gusts initially toward the northeast but later curving southwestward. Reports of similar wind shifts throughout the region suggested that the gale persisted, stationary, for several hours. It eventually moved back out to sea while south of Norfolk, Virginia, departing the region on 24 August. The hurricane maintained 1-minute maximum sustained winds of 110 mph (175 km/h) while offshore, equivalent to a Category 2 system on the Saffir–Simpson hurricane wind scale.

Impact 
The hurricane damaged several vessels while still drifting at sea, dispersing and damaging Jérôme Bonaparte's fleet and dismasting the 74-gun French ship of the line , which later landed near Cape Henry.

In Charleston, South Carolina, the hurricane washed aground several ships and uprooted numerous trees, though damage to the city harbor was minimal. The lighthouse on North Island flanking Winyah Bay collapsed under high winds, and in Georgetown proper, the hurricane was considered to be the worst since the 1804 Antigua–Charleston hurricane, despite its storm surge being of a lesser size. A cotton field covering 94 acres was ruined nearby. At Smithville, North Carolina, numerous ships experienced damage, while considerable destruction to structures was observed, with many wharves wrecked. Meanwhile, at Wilmington, the hurricane inflicted widespread damage, with many wharves severely damaged, and significant losses sustained by salt, sugar, rice, and lumber industries. The gable sections of three masonry houses were destroyed by wind or water, and wooden houses suffered especially badly, with many obliterated and those under construction flattened. One individual died after a wall collapsed and several slaves were killed, one by drowning, at local plantations. At Bald Head Island, the United States Revenue Cutter Service vessel Governor Williams was stripped of its foremast and subsequently ran ashore before being repaired and continuing on its journey. A second boat owned by the agency, the Diligence, was tethered at port in Wilmington and endured no damage; similarly, little impact occurred at New Bern. Throughout the storm, several vessels and supplies of stranded sailors were driven aground along the North Carolinan coast. On the Bogue Banks, the remains of the Adolphus and Atlantic were discovered, and at the Core Banks, a dead body was washed ashore, partially eaten by fish.

Moderate damage occurred upon the hurricane's arrival in Norfolk, Virginia. Winds toppled a number of newly built structures and chimneys, uprooted trees and fences, and washed two watercraft aground. After the storm, alterations to the shoreline around the Chesapeake Bay permitted the full establishment of a town at Willoughby Spit. The Rose-in-Bloom was caught in the hurricane while offshore of Barnegat Inlet, New Jersey, en route to New York City from Charleston, but was struck by a large wave which overturned the ship, resulting in the deaths of 21 of its 48 passengers and the loss of $171,000 of its $180,000 (1806 USD) cargo. The vessel only barely stayed afloat, with 30 bales of cotton preventing it from sinking entirely; survivors were ferried to New York by the British brig Swift, which had then been traveling toward St. John's, Newfoundland. The hurricane produced strong gusts within the vicinity of New York City, and at Belleville, New Jersey, several peach trees were defoliated and uprooted. Cape Cod, Massachusetts was struck by heavy rain and observed minor damage to its port.

See also 

1804 Antigua–Charleston hurricane
1806 Atlantic hurricane season
List of New England hurricanes
List of North Carolina hurricanes (pre-1900)
Hurricane Isabel

Notes

Footnotes

Citations

References 

1806
1806
1806
1806
1806
1806
1806
1806
1806
1806
Great Coastal hurricane
hurricane
1806
1806 in Massachusetts
1806 meteorology
1806 disasters in Canada
1806 in Canada